Phytoecia rebeccae is a species of beetle in the family Cerambycidae. It was described by Sama and Rejzek in 2002.

References

Phytoecia
Beetles described in 2002